The Seven Husbands of Evelyn Hugo is a historical fiction novel by American author Taylor Jenkins Reid and published by Atria Books in 2017. The novel tells the story of the fictional Old Hollywood star Evelyn Hugo, who at age 79 gives a final interview to an unknown journalist, Monique Grant.
 
The novel was nominated for a Goodreads Choice Award for Best Historical Fiction of 2017.

Plot
Monique Grant, a reporter for Vivant magazine, has been selected to interview Evelyn Hugo, a reclusive former star, who is auctioning some of her famous gowns to raise money for a breast cancer charity. Monique is confused about why Evelyn has chosen her, but goes to Evelyn's apartment to meet her. Evelyn reveals she has no interest in giving an interview for Vivant but instead wants Monique to write her life story, and Monique agrees, though she is suspicious.

Evelyn meets her first husband, Ernie Diaz, at 14. She then marries him in order to reach Hollywood and escape her abusive father in Hell's Kitchen. She is noticed by Harry Cameron, a young Sunset Studios producer, and the two become close friends. Evelyn seduces a Sunset executive in order to advance her career and divorces Ernie when the studio sets her up with popular actors for publicity. She falls in love with and marries actor Don Adler, but in the following months, Don begins to abuse Evelyn when pressure is placed on his career.

In an adaptation of Little Women, Evelyn, now 21, stars opposite Celia St. James. Evelyn is initially jealous of Celia's talent, but the two quickly form a bond. At a party, Evelyn is told that Celia is a lesbian. Evelyn privately confronts Celia to ask if this is true, and the two kiss. Evelyn discovers that Don has been cheating on her, but he divorces her first and sabotages her career. To revive her popularity, Evelyn goes to Paris and stars in a racy film by French director Max Girard. Rumors have begun to spread about Evelyn and Celia's relationship, so Evelyn creates a plan to distract the press. She seduces and elopes with singer Mick Riva, then has the marriage annulled the next day. The plan works, but Evelyn is pregnant. She gets an abortion, but Celia is furious and leaves her. They do not speak for five years.

After starring in an adaptation of Anna Karenina, Evelyn marries her co-star, Rex North, to generate publicity. They stay married for a few years, but after Rex impregnates his girlfriend, Evelyn spins a story that she and Harry Cameron were having an affair. In reality, Harry is secretly dating quarterback John Braverman, who is married to Celia. Evelyn and Celia reunite. Evelyn marries Harry, and they live closely with Celia and John, posing as two heterosexual couples. After several idyllic years, Harry suggests that he and Evelyn have a child, and Evelyn agrees. With Celia's blessing, they have a daughter named Connor.

In her late 30s, Evelyn stars in another Max Girard movie, in which she agrees to an explicit sex scene. She realizes afterward that she should have asked Celia's permission. Celia leaves Evelyn again. John Braverman dies of a heart attack, and Harry begins drinking excessively. Evelyn agrees to marry Max Girard, but quickly discovers that he does not truly love her as a person, but as the sex symbol she had become. She stays married to him for six years before reuniting with Celia. Celia has emphysema and less than ten years to live. Evelyn finds Harry and a dead passenger in a car accident outside his house. Evelyn moves the passenger, Harry's lover, into the driver's seat to protect Harry from being convicted of drunk driving. Harry dies in the hospital.

Evelyn, Celia, and Connor move to Spain, along with Celia's brother Robert, whom Evelyn marries as a front so she will be able to inherit Celia's estate when she dies. Celia dies when she is 61, and Robert several years after that. Evelyn explains to Monique that Connor died of breast cancer, which Evelyn has also been diagnosed with. Evelyn reveals that Monique's father, James Grant, was the passenger in Harry's car. By removing Harry from the scene, Evelyn allowed Monique and her mother to believe that James had died driving drunk. Monique is furious and leaves but realizes that Evelyn has told her all this because she intends to end her life. She considers calling authorities but decides that it should be Evelyn's choice if she wants to die. She realizes that she will forgive Evelyn some day. Evelyn's death is reported as an accidental overdose, and Monique publishes the introduction for her biography in Vivant, finally disclosing that the true love of Evelyn's life was none of her husbands, but Celia St. James.

Background 
Reid released the book cover and an excerpt of the book in Entertainment Weekly on December 6, 2016. 

According to Reid, Evelyn is loosely based in part on actresses Elizabeth Taylor, who was married eight times to seven different men, and Ava Gardner, who revealed the secrets of her life to a journalist, who published them in Ava Gardner: The Secret Conversations. Reid has also said Rita Hayworth was an influence on Evelyn. Hayworth, whose father was a Spaniard, had a very similar start to Evelyn's and multiple relationships throughout her career. Other influences included Tab Hunter Confidential: The Making of a Movie Star, an autobiography by Tab Hunter that describes what life was like for the LGBTQ+ community in Hollywood at the time, and Scandals of Classic Hollywood by Anne Helen Petersen.

Editions

The Seven Husbands of Evelyn Hugo was released in hardcover on June 1, 2017, by Atria Publishing Group. By June 13, the novel was released in paperback, Audible audio, and Kindle edition. The Seven Husbands of Evelyn Hugo was also translated for print into Spanish, Portuguese, Polish, Turkish, Lithuanian, Swedish, Croatian, French, Slovak, Hungarian, German, Dutch, and Italian.

Adaptations

Cancelled television adaptation
In 2019, Freeform and Fox 21 Television Studios picked up the rights for development. Jennifer Beals and Ilene Chaiken, who worked on The L Word, were to produce the show. Reid was to work on the show as a screenwriter. In June 2021, Reid confirmed in an interview that the rights were no longer owned by Freeform and would be produced on another platform. She said she felt "really good with the direction that it's going in".

Film adaptation
On March 24, 2022, it was announced that Netflix will be adapting the novel into a feature film with Liz Tigelaar writing and Margaret Chernin executive producing.

Reception
The novel received positive reviews. The Globe and Mail called it "a cinematic tale with hardscrabble roots, staggering highs and sickening lows." The novel was nominated for a Goodreads Choice Award for Best Historical Fiction of 2017, and a finalist for Book of the Month's Book of the Year award in 2017.

References 

2017 American novels
American LGBT novels
Hollywood novels
Novels about actors
Atria Publishing Group books
Novels about journalists